Miss Venezuela 2007 was the 54th Miss Venezuela pageant, was held in Caracas, on September 13, 2007, after four weeks of events.  The winner of the pageant was Dayana Mendoza, Miss Amazonas, who went on to win Miss Universe 2008.

The pageant was broadcast live on Venevisión from the Poliedro de Caracas in Caracas, Venezuela. At the conclusion of the final night of competition, outgoing titleholder Ly Jonaitis crowned Dayana Mendoza of Amazonas as the new Miss Venezuela.

Results

Special awards
 Miss Photogenic (voted by press reporters) - Hannelly Quintero (Cojedes)
 Miss Internet (voted by www.missvenezuela.com viewers) - Mónica Besereni (Aragua)
 Miss Congeniality (voted by Miss Venezuela contestants) - Kelly García (Península Goajira)
 Miss Personality - Anyelika Pérez (Vargas)
 Best Body - Luna Ramos (Trujillo)
 Best Smile - Andrea Matthies (Sucre)
 Miss Integral - Dayana Mendoza (Amazonas)
 Miss Beauty - Hannelly Quintero (Cojedes)
 Best Legs - Andreína Ellington (Distrito Capital)
 Miss Elegance - Luna Ramos (Trujillo)
 Best Face - Mónica Besereni (Aragua)

Delegates
The Miss Venezuela 2007 delegates are:

Final judges
Carmen María Montiel - Miss Venezuela 1984
Christophe Didier - Delta Air Lines Latin American Vice President 
Daniela Kosán - Miss Venezuela International 1997 and E! News Latinamerica Host and model 
Carlos Dorado - Casablanca Store President
María Cristina Rivero Capriles - Fashion designer 
Valfrido A.N. Menezes - Brazilian Fashion Stylist
Alirio Noguera - Businessman
Nakary Molina - Model and Miss Táchira 2006 contestant
Carlos Croes - Multinacional de Seguros Market Vice-President
Noura Al Gabandi - Kuwait ambassador's wife 
José Guillermo Ramos - Ebel Paris General Director  
Ivanova Clement - Escada Director in Venezuela
Daniela di Giacomo - Miss International 2006 
Julio César Reyes - Mayor of Barinas City
Alejandra Espinoza - Nuestra Belleza Latina 2007 from México
Anarella Bono - Miss Anzoátegui 1997 TV Host and model
Larry Hernández - Movistar Venezuela Advertising and Communications Executive Director
Patricia Azócar - Exclusiva magazine president
Elizabeth Cuenca - Entre Socios General Director and Editor 
Ricardo Aldama - Rex Fabrics President from Miami
John Losada - Machado, García, Serra Communications from Miami Vice-President 
Mayra de Belloso - Latin-American Representative of The Gem Palace
Ying Juan Tei - Artistic Adviser of the Cultural Association of Beijing
Luisa Lucchi - Lucchi Shoes president
Milena Portillo - Businesswoman
María Eugenia Maldonado - LG Electronics Product Manager

Notes
Dayana Mendoza won Miss Universe 2008 in Nha Trang, Vietnam.
Hannelly Quintero placed as semifinalist in Miss World 2008 in Johannesburg, South Africa, when she won the Miss World Americas title. She also competed in Reina Hispanoamericana 2007 in Santa Cruz, Bolivia, when she placed in the Top 5. She won the Miss Intercontinental 2009 pageant, in Minsk, Belarus.
Dayana Colmenares placed as semifinalist in Miss International 2008 in Macau, China. She previously placed as 2nd runner up in Miss Continente Americano 2006 in Guayaquil, Ecuador.
Mónica Bsereni placed as 2nd runner-up in Reinado Internacional del Café 2008 in Manizales, Colombia.
Anyélika Pérez placed as semifinalist in Top Model of the World 2008 in Hurghada, Egypt. 
Andrea Matthies placed as finalist in Miss Continente Americano 2008 in Guayaquil, Ecuador.
Josephine Karam won International Queen of Banana 2009 in Machala, Ecuador.
Iselmar Burgos placed as semifinalist in Miss Intercontinental 2007 in Mahé, Seychelles.
María Gabriela Garmendia placed as 3rd runner-up in Miss Intercontinental 2008 in Zabrze, Poland.
Kellyn García won Sambil Model Venezuela 2011.
Myriam Abreu won Miss Tourism Intercontinental 2010 in Miri, Malaysia. 
Luna Ramos placed as 2nd runner-up in Miss Bikini International 2010 in Sanya, China; and won Miss World Next Top Model 2010, in Beirut, Lebanon.
 When the hosts were presenting Anarella Bono as a Judge, she was booed by the audience for  supporting the government of the President Hugo Chávez.
At the end of the Miss Venezuela 2007 pageant after the two winners were crowned, a man named Yendri Sánchez among the audience rushed on the stage and grabbed the crown from Hannelys.  He then jumped on top of the queen's throne where the stage crew caught him.  They immediately dragged him off the stage.  Meanwhile, the cameras were focusing on Dayana's winning walk and the two hosts kept with the program.

References

External links
Miss Venezuela official website

2007 in Venezuela
2007 beauty pageants